iBoy is a 2017 superhero film distributed by Netflix, starring Bill Milner and Maisie Williams. It is based on the 2010 novel of the same name by Kevin Brooks. It was filmed in and around East-Central London, in particular the Middlesex Street Estate.

Plot
Living in a gang-ridden part of London, 16-year-old Tom Harvey struggles to get by. His best friend Danny gets him a new phone and encourages him to romantically pursue his longtime friend and neighbor Lucy. Lucy asks Tom to help her study for exams, to which he happily agrees. Arriving at her flat that night, Tom sees Lucy's brother unconscious and a group of masked thugs exiting Lucy's room, having raped her and recorded the event. Tom flees and attempts to call the police, but he is shot in the head and rendered unconscious.

Tom awakens days later. His doctor informs him that shrapnel from his phone is embedded in his head. Later that day, Tom begins to hear phone transmissions and can visualize digital signals. Using his newfound abilities, Tom realizes who attacked Lucy. He begins to take revenge on the attackers, one by one. Meanwhile, Lucy has become a shut-in, and Tom is her only source of hope. They enjoy a meal together outside for the first time since the incident. After a confrontation, Tom's vengeance grows and he tracks down those who gave the orders to hurt Lucy. He raids their leader's home, damaging his electronics and stealing his cache of cocaine which Tom plants on the attackers before tipping off the police.

Furthering his vigilantism, Tom adopts the alias "iBoy." He texts Lucy that he intends to set things right for her. He posts his acts online and working his way to take out more drugs that are coming in. During another raid, Tom gets trapped by the gang and is beaten severely, barely managing to escape. He stumbles his way home, but passes out in a park on the way, missing his exams and breaking a promise to Lucy. When he goes home, Tom's grandmother is held at gunpoint and the crime boss known as Ellman has been attempting to thwart demands that Tom gives back the money he stole in exchange for Lucy and his grandmother's safety. Tom reluctantly agrees and begins to use his powers for both Ellman and to track and help Lucy, who has been kidnapped by those that assaulted her before.

Tom is driven to the kidnapping site, where he is able to call the police, but they are unable to find anything there. Lucy is able to get a gun away from the kidnappers, but unable to escape before Tom and Ellman arrive. Though Tom's powers were diminished due to his beating, Tom is able to overload everyone's cell phones to explode, but Ellman threw his away and flees outside. Tom attempts to subdue him with help from Lucy, but both are unable to do so until Tom unleashes a pulse from his brain, knocking all of them out. Tom awakens later in the hospital with his grandmother by his side.

Returning home, Tom sees Danny (who betrayed him to Ellman). Danny says he wants to repay Tom for his mistreatment of Tom. Tom rebuffs him, saying he never took down the person who recorded Lucy's attack, suggesting it was Danny. Tom meets Lucy on the roof of their building, who has made a picnic for the two of them. They share a kiss while looking out to the skyline and without resolving whether Tom's pulse removed his powers.

Cast
 Bill Milner as Tom Harvey / iBoy, a teenager who suffers severe head injuries and develops cybernatural powers. 
 Maisie Williams as Lucy Walker, Tom's classmate and love interest.
 Miranda Richardson as Wendy "Nan" Harvey, Tom's grandmother.
 Rory Kinnear as Ellman, an evil kingpin who plans to get revenge on Tom's violent and inexplicable powers by manipulating him into robbing The Bank of England.
 Charley Palmer Rothwell as Eugene, a gangster who is a partner of Ellman's.
 Jordan Bolger as Danny, Tom's classmate and best friend. 
 Armin Karima as Ant, a gangster from Ellman's group.
 Helen Daniels as Kelly
 Aymen Hamdouchi as Cutz
 McKell David as Hazzard
 Shaquille Ali-Yebuah as Cass
 Leon Annor as Keon
 Lucy Thackeray as Michelle
 Oliver Coopersmith as Ben
 Petrice Jones as Shotgun

Reception
Early reviews of the film were mixed. Review aggregator website Rotten Tomatoes reported that 69% of critics have given the film a positive review based on 13 reviews, with an average rating of 5.60/10. The site's critics consensus reads, "iBoys original premise and Maisie Williams' strong performance aren't enough to overwrite a clichéd narrative, too-serious tone, and overall glitchy execution." On Metacritic, the film has a weighted average score of 50 out of 100 based on 5 critic reviews, indicating "mixed or average reviews". The Guardian reviewed it negatively saying, "This could work with humour — but not realist grimness. It’s a nice idea which doesn’t quite come off."

References

External links
 iBoy on Netflix
 

2017 films
2010s science fiction thriller films
2010s superhero films
American science fiction thriller films
American superhero films
English-language Netflix original films
Films set in London
Teen superhero films
2010s English-language films
2010s American films